Nigel Chapman may refer to:

 Nigel Chapman (mayor), mayor of Colchester
 Nigel Chapman (cricketer) (born 1945), English cricketer